Repollal (lit. place of cabbages) is group of hamlets in Ascención Island of Guaitecas Archipelago, southern Chile. Repollal consists from north to south of three hamlets; Repollal Alto, Repollal Medio and Repollal Bajo. All the hamlets lie to the west of Melinka which is the only town in the archipelago. In 2002 the population of Repollal Alto was 81, in Repollal Medio it was 7 and in Repollal Bajo 36. Repollal is connected to Melinka by a gravel road. The population of Repollal is made up descendants of settlers from Chiloé Archipelago.

References

Guaitecas Archipelago
Ports and harbours of Chile
Populated places in Aysén Province
Populated places in the fjords and channels of Chile